Dong Mingzhu (born August 1954) is a Chinese businesswoman who serves as Chairwoman of Gree Electric.

Early life
Dong Mingzhu was born the youngest of seven children in a working-class family in Nanjing, capital of east China's Jiangsu province, in August 1954. When she was a child, she wanted to be a soldier, doctor or teacher. Dong graduated from a specialized institute in Wuhu, Anhui in 1975, with a degree in Statistics.  After graduation, Dong got an administrative job at local government chemistry laboratory in Nanjing for 15 years.

Career
In 1990, at age 36, recently widowed Dong left her three-year-old son to his grandmother and quit her job at the government research facility in order to move to the more economically developed Shenzhen in Guangdong province and to find a new job, but moved to Zhuhai soon.

Joining Haley (Gree Electric's predecessor) as a salesperson, she made her mark from the start, recovering massive debts in a little over one month. By 1994, Dong was made head of sales, where she upgraded sales process. By the time Gree Electric went public in 1996, Dong was deputy president, and later company president in 2001.  In 2012, she gained the position of Gree Electric's chairwoman as well. She was also the chairwoman of Gree Electric's parent company Gree Group until November 2016.

During her tenure, Dong developed Gree Electric into the world's largest household air conditioning unit maker, and China's largest household appliance maker (generating a record breaking 140 billion Yuan revenue in 2014). Gree Electric's sales shifted from traditional to online, contributing significantly to the company's 2014 record breaking revenue. Gree Electric's company stock has risen 2300% during her stay. Under her leadership, Gree Electric developed solar energy, China's smartphone market, robotic technology, recycled treatment centers nationwide, and acquired electric car maker Yinlong in March 2016.

In January 2019, she was reelected chairwoman of Gree Electric. 2 months later, she applied a cut on value-added taxes to reach more competitive prices and aim for an aggressive international development despite the US-China trade war going on.

Dong has displayed a strong nationalistic streak over the year, and has been a member of the 10th, 11th, and 12th National People's Congress. She is a member of the China Democratic National Construction Association, as well as a member of the 10th Executive Committee of All-china Women's Federation.  Dong currently holds senior positions in a dozen industry, women's and charity organizations, and has taught university business classes.

In 2021, Fortune the most influential women in the world ranked seventh.

Prizes
2015: 4th most powerful woman in Asia-Pacific by Fortune magazine 
2014,2015: Most Influential Chinese Businesswomen by Fortune magazine
2013: "Woman in the Mix" for business by Forbes Asia
2006: "Magnificent 10" economic leaders in China

Personal life
Dong married soon after graduating from university, but was widowed when her son turned two-year-old. Her husband died of illness in 1984. Her son nicknamed "Dongdong". She never remarried. The New York Times called her "one of the toughest businesswomen in China."

In 2018, law enforcement in Ningbo mistakenly accused Dong of jaywalking because her face was featured in an advertisement on the side of a bus and inaccurately flagged by a facial recognition system.

Published work
Regretless Pursuit, 2006, which was made into a television series on China Central Television.

References

Bibliography

External links
Interview with Dong Mingzhu via Dialogue
 Dong Mingzhu  Video produced by Makers: Women Who Make America

Living people
Chinese women chief executives
Businesspeople from Nanjing
1954 births
Businesspeople in electronics
Chinese women writers
Delegates to the 13th National People's Congress
Delegates to the 12th National People's Congress
Delegates to the 11th National People's Congress
Delegates to the 10th National People's Congress
Members of the China National Democratic Construction Association